The giant musk turtle (Staurotypus salvinii) , also known commonly as the Chiapas giant musk turtle or the Mexican giant musk turtle , is a species of turtle in the family Kinosternidae. The species is found in Central America.

Geographic range
S. salvinii is found in Belize, El Salvador, Guatemala, western Honduras, and Mexico (Chiapas and Oaxaca).

Habitat
The giant musk turtle prefers to inhabit slow-moving bodies of freshwater such as reservoirs, and rivers with soft bottoms and ample vegetation.

Etymology
The specific name, salvinii, is in honor of English naturalist and herpetologist Osbert Salvin.

Description
S. salvinii is typically much larger than other species of Kinosternidae, attaining a straight carapace length of up to 38 cm (15 inches), with males being significantly smaller than females. It is typically brown, black, or green in color, with a yellow underside. The carapace is distinguished by three distinct ridges, or keels which run its length. The giant musk turtle tends to be quite aggressive, agile and energetic.

S. salvinii exhibits XX/XY sex determination, in contrast to the temperature-dependent sex determination of most turtles.

Diet
Like other musk turtle species, S. salvinii is carnivorous, eating various species of fishes, crustaceans, smaller turtles, insects, mollusks, and carrion. The giant musk turtle's feeding technique is to open its mouth rapidly leading to a powerful inrush of water which sucks the prey into its mouth.

Reproduction
S. salvinii is oviparous.

References

External links
Tortoise & Freshwater Turtle Specialist Group (1996). Staurotypus salvinii .   2006 IUCN Red List of Threatened Species. Downloaded on 29 July 2007.

Further reading
Gray JE (1864). "Description of a New Species of Staurotypus (S. salvinii ) from Guatemala". Proceedings of the Zoological Society of London 1864: 127–128.

Giant Musk Turtle
Reptiles of El Salvador
Reptiles of Guatemala
Reptiles of Mexico
Reptiles described in 1864
Taxa named by John Edward Gray
Taxonomy articles created by Polbot